Edrom railway station served the village of Edrom, Scottish Borders, Scotland from 1852 to 1951 on the Berwickshire Railway.

History 
The station opened in May 1852 by the North British Railway. It initially had two platforms but it was later reduced to one when the line was singled. To the northeast was the goods yard which had a loading bank and a shed. A viaduct was built over the Whiteadder Water to support the railway. The station closed to passengers on 10 September 1951.

References

External links 

Disused railway stations in the Scottish Borders
Former North British Railway stations
Railway stations in Great Britain opened in 1852
Railway stations in Great Britain closed in 1951
1852 establishments in Scotland
1951 disestablishments in Scotland